McGuire Island may refer to either of the following islands:

 McGuire Island (Antarctica), island in Antarctica
 McGuire Island (Oregon), island in the Columbia River in Oregon